Dušan Mandić (born 16 June 1994) is a Serbian water polo player who plays for VK Novi Beograd. He was a part  of the Montenegrin junior water polo team before opting to play for Serbia.  With Serbian junior national team he won a gold medal at the 2011 Junior Water Polo World Championship. At the 2012 Summer Olympics, he competed for the Serbia men's national water polo team in the men's event.

Honours

Club
 Primorac Kotor
LEN Champions League runners-up: 2009–10
Montenegrin Cup: 2009–10 
Partizan
 Serbian Chanmpionship: 2010–11, 2011–12, 2014–15
Serbian Cup: 2010–11, 2011–12
Eurointer League: 2011
LEN Champions League: 2010–11
LEN Super Cup: 2012
Pro Recco 
LEN Champions League: 2020–21 ; runners-up: 2017–18
Serie A: 2015–16, 2016–17, 2017–18, 2018–19
Coppa Italia: 2015–16, 2016–17, 2017–18, 2018–19, 2020–21
 Novi Beograd
LEN Champions League runners-up: 2021–22
 Adriatic League: 2021–22
 Serbian Championship: 2021–22

Awards
Total-waterpolo magazine's man water polo "World Player of the Year" award: 2021
Member of the World Team: 2018, 2021 by total-waterpolo
Second Top European Player in the World by LEN: 2021
LEN Champions League Final Eight MVP: 2021 with Pro Recco
2019 World Championship Team of the Tournament
World League MVP: 2015 Bergamo
"Young Athlete of the Year" by Olympic Committee of Serbia: 2012

See also
 Serbia men's Olympic water polo team records and statistics
 List of Olympic champions in men's water polo
 List of Olympic medalists in water polo (men)
 List of world champions in men's water polo
 List of World Aquatics Championships medalists in water polo

References

External links

 
 

1994 births
Living people
Serbs of Montenegro
People from Kotor
Serbian male water polo players
Water polo drivers
Left-handed water polo players
Water polo players at the 2012 Summer Olympics
Water polo players at the 2016 Summer Olympics
Water polo players at the 2020 Summer Olympics
Medalists at the 2012 Summer Olympics
Medalists at the 2016 Summer Olympics
Medalists at the 2020 Summer Olympics
Olympic gold medalists for Serbia in water polo
Olympic bronze medalists for Serbia in water polo
World Aquatics Championships medalists in water polo
European champions for Serbia
Competitors at the 2018 Mediterranean Games
Mediterranean Games medalists in water polo
Mediterranean Games gold medalists for Serbia
Serbian expatriate sportspeople in Italy